The Provincial Waterworks Authority (PWA) is a Thai state enterprise under the Ministry of Interior. The PWA is responsible for the production and distribution of potable water that meets WHO standards to 74 provinces throughout Thailand—all except Bangkok, Samut Prakan, and Nonthaburi)—which are served by the Metropolitan Waterworks Authority.

History
The Provincial Waterworks Authority was established on 28 February 1979, as a state enterprise under the jurisdiction of the Interior Ministry. Prior to the creation of the PWA, water supply services in the provincial areas had been assigned to two government agencies—the Department of Public Works (DOPW) was in charge of the water supply services in municipal areas outside the Bangkok metropolitan area, while the Department of Health (DOH) took care of rural areas. When the performance of these two agencies was found wanting, the government shifted water supply affairs, along with officials and employees, transferred from DOPW's provincial waterworks division and DOH's rural waterworks division, to the newly created Provincial Waterworks Authority. The governor of the PWA is Mr Seree Supratid.

Operations
As of end-May 2014, the PWA had 7,730 employees, 987 of them working at Bangkok headquarters, and the remaining 6,743 staffers working at 10 PWA regional offices and 233 waterworks across the country. Of Thailand's 20.7 million households, PWA provides water services to 3.6 million of them (24.5 percent of the country's total households) or 16 million persons. A sister-agency, the Metropolitan Waterworks Authority (MWA), provides water services to 2.1 million households (12.5 percent) or 8.4 million persons in Bangkok and two neighboring provinces. Local governments provide water services to 11.5 million households (52.48 percent) or 38.7 million persons in regional areas. Over 3.5 million households (12.41 percent) or 8.25 million persons, mostly in remote rural areas, have no access to piped-water.

Financials
In its fiscal year 2014 (1 October 2013-30 September 2014), PWA reported revenues of 26,017 million baht, total assets of 89,226 million baht, and net profit of 5,775 million baht.

See also 

 Metropolitan Waterworks Authority
 Provincial Electricity Authority

References

External links
Provincial Waterworks Authority
Metropolitan Waterworks Authority

State enterprises of Thailand
Infrastructure in Thailand
Water management authorities
Water companies of Thailand
1979 establishments in Thailand